The year 1757 in architecture involved some significant events.

Events

Buildings and structures

Buildings
 Frederiks Hospital, Copenhagen, is opened.
 Middlesex Hospital, London, is opened.
 Vorontsov Palace (Saint Petersburg), designed by Francesco Bartolomeo Rastrelli, is completed.
 Gammel Holtegård near Copenhagen is completed by architect Lauritz de Thurah as a house for himself.
 Hôtel d'Esmivy de Moissac in Aix-en-Provence is completed with a façade designed by Georges Vallon.
 Nuthall Temple in Nottinghamshire, England, a Palladian house attributed to the polymath Thomas Wright, is completed.
 Swinfen Hall in Staffordshire, England, designed by Benjamin Wyatt, is built.
 Church of the Dormition of the Theotokos, Negoslavci in Croatia is completed.
 Wolvendaal Church in Colombo (Dutch Ceylon) is completed.
 Ossian's Hall of Mirrors in Scotland, a folly, is built.

Publications
 William Chambers – Designs of Chinese Buildings, furniture, dresses, machines, and utensils: to which is annexed a description of their temples, houses, gardens, &c. (London)

Births
 January 16 – Samuel McIntire, American architect (died 1811)
 May 4 – Manuel Tolsá, Spanish architect and sculptor working in Mexico (died 1816)
 August 9 – Thomas Telford, British civil engineer (died 1834)

Deaths
 March 12 – Giuseppe Galli Bibiena, Italian architect and painter (born 1696)

References